Shindo Go (born 18 July 1987) is a Japanese former professional boxer who held the WBC female flyweight title from 2013 to 2014. At regional level he held the OPBF female flyweight title in 2011. Since 2017, Go has been transgender and retired from women's boxing.

Career 
On 25 May 2008, Go made his professional debut at the local Wakayama Prefectural Gymnasium in the match against former amateur Japanese champion Masae Akitaya which he lost by a unanimous decision. In 2012, he lost against Mariana Juárez for the WBC female flyweight title. Later in 2013, he won the WBC female flyweight title defeating then world champion Renáta Szebelédi via a 10 round unanimous decision at the Big Wave, Wakayama, Japan.

Retirement 
On 17 July 2017, it was reported that he became a man after undergoing sex reassignment surgery and changing his family register, married a cis-gender woman, and plans to submit a retirement notice.
On October 30, 2017, he announced his retirement from active boxing with a record of 16 wins (11KO) and 4 losses. He also indicated his intention to convert to a male professional boxer in the future.

References

External links 

Living people
1987 births
Japanese women boxers
Sportspeople from Okayama Prefecture
Bantamweight boxers
World flyweight boxing champions
World Boxing Council champions
Transgender sportsmen
LGBT boxers
Transgender men
Japanese LGBT sportspeople
Japanese transgender people